Adlai E. Stevenson High School (AESHS), commonly called Stevenson High School (SHS), is a four-year public high school located in Lincolnshire, Illinois, United States. It is named after Adlai E. Stevenson II, the 31st Governor of Illinois.

History

Adlai E. Stevenson High School opened in September 1965. Before the opening of Stevenson, the students in the Stevenson area attended Ela-Vernon High School in Lake Zurich. Stevenson was planned to be a second school for the growing district, but the western side (Lake Zurich) of the district decided to build their own district. This left Stevenson with an unfinished building, no board or administration, and no faculty. When Stevenson opened to 467 students and 31 teachers in 1965, the building was not carpeted, the library was empty, most classrooms were without desks and athletic fields were non-existent, as most of the school furniture had been shipped to Prairie View, Texas instead of Prairie View, Illinois.

In the 2005-06 school year, Stevenson had its highest enrollment of 4,573 students. Between the 2005–06 and 2014-15 school years, each school year saw progressively declining enrollment in the student body. In the 2014-15 school year, Stevenson had its first enrollment increase since the peak in the 2005-06 school year. Stevenson's enrollment was 4,337 for the 2018-19 school year, and enrollment is expected to surpass 4500 by 2020.

Stevenson has grown since its opening to become one of the largest high schools in the area. The school has undergone various additions over the years, the first being in 1970 where the school gym, auto shop, and pool were renovated. To accommodate the increasing student population, another round of remodeling occurred in the mid-1990s. After the addition of the three-level east building in 1995, the physical size of SHS increased to more than six times its original size of 113,000 square feet. The new east building included 60 new classrooms, a new Performing Arts Center (PAC), the Patriot Aquatic Center, Field House, and the Technology Center, among other projects as well. Also built was a new indoor walkway ("The Link") between the original west building and the new east building. The link is very crowded.

In 2004, the main entrance to the school was completely rebuilt and transformed into another commons area now known as "The Point." Other renovations that year included more fine arts areas around the band, choir, and orchestra rooms in the west building as well. Around 2008, many of the athletic fields were expanded and the football field got new turf. In that same year, the original auditorium was renovated as well.

In 2011, the school library and student resource center in the old/west building were renovated for the first time in Stevenson's history. The project was finished in 2015 when the removal of the two lecture halls was completed to make way for the Quiet Learning Center (QLC). In addition to the new ILC/QLC, the photography studio was also renovated in the summer of 2013.

In 2019, the school added an extension to the east building, including 22 new classrooms, conference rooms, a green roof and flower garden, multiple living walls and solar panels, with the intent of making the new addition a net-zero building.

In 2020, Stevenson began planning for an additional expansion, with new athletic courts, an artificial turf playing field, a larger running track, an area for exercise equipment, and other features to be built in the enlarged field house. This addition was finished in August 2022.

Demographics
White: 63.4%, Asian: 24.7%, Hispanic: 7.6%, Black: 1.5%, Two or More Races: 2.6%, American Indian: 0.2%

Communities served
The school serves students in the area's District 125 coming from Lincolnshire, Long Grove, Prairie View, portions of Buffalo Grove, Mundelein, Kildeer, Hawthorn Woods and smaller portions of Vernon Hills, Lake Zurich, Riverwoods,  Bannockburn,  and Mettawa.

Feeder schools

Public schools

Controversies and incidents

Newspaper censorship
In November 2009, a dispute erupted between school officials and the student newspaper, The Statesman, regarding censorship of stories. The administration stopped publication of the November 20 issue, objecting to stories regarding drugs, teen pregnancy, and shoplifting. When students wanted to leave the front page blank in protest of the censorship, the officials instead required the students to produce other stories approved by the administration. The Stevenson public information officer released a statement November 20 stating the administration did not think anonymous sources discussing alleged illegal activity was fit for print.

The Chicago Tribune, in a November 26 editorial, said the school was wrong to force students to produce administration-approved stories. "This isn't editing, it's censorship," wrote columnist Zak Stombor. The Society of Professional Journalists' Freedom of Information chairman called the censorship "immoral, un-American, irresponsible and not fit for education."

Following the censorship fiasco, 11 of 14 Statesman staffers — and all the paper's top editors — resigned from their positions at the start of the spring 2010 semester.

Confiscation of student cellphones
In February 2012, the school administration initiated an investigation into marijuana sales at the school, during which the cellphones of students suspected of marijuana sales were confiscated, and the text messages stored on the phones were read.  The American Civil Liberties Union of Illinois described the incident as a "fishing expedition", while school officials stated they were "perfectly within our rights".  In one instance a student was suspended for five days and barred from participating in extracurricular activities because he refused to provide the password to his cellphone.  The probe resulted in two arrests on misdemeanor drug charges.

Athletics

The Stevenson Patriots compete in the North Suburban Conference.

Badminton
Baseball
Basketball
Bass Fishing
Bowling
Cheerleading
Cross Country
Fencing
Field Hockey
Football
Golf
Gymnastics

Ice hockey
Lacrosse
Patriettes (Dance squad)
Soccer
Softball
Swimming
Tennis
Track and Field
Volleyball
Water Polo
Wrestling

Stevenson High School is a member of the IHSA, the athletic teams are stylized as the Patriots. Many of its teams are top-ranked nationally and have a history of producing collegiate and professional athletes.

The following teams have won their respective IHSA sponsored state championship tournament or meets:

Awards and recognition
Stevenson High School is one of the only high schools in the country to receive the United States Department of Education's "Excellence in Education" Blue Ribbon Award five times. In addition, Stevenson has been named one of America's top high schools by both U.S. News & World Report and Newsweek magazines, and has been named a National School of Distinction in Arts Education by the John F. Kennedy Center for the Performing Arts.

Niche ranked Stevenson as one of the best public high schools in America in 2017. In 2016, Niche gave A+ ratings in the following areas: academics, teachers, educational outcomes, health and safety, resources and facilities, sports and fitness, co-curricular activities, food service, and administration and policies.

Several national publications have regularly included Stevenson in their lists of America's best public high schools. Stevenson was the top-ranked open-enrollment public high school in Illinois in 2021, 2015, and 2014 in U.S. News & World Report, and was the top-ranked open-enrollment school in Illinois in the Washington Post’s rankings in 2014, 2013, and 2012.

In 2021, U.S. News & World Report ranked Stevenson as 171st in national rankings and 6th in Illinois.

For the class of 2016, 99.9% attended college. In 2015-2016, 360 students were named Illinois State Scholars. In addition, there were 32 National Merit Semi-Finalists in the Class of 2016 and 38 Commended students.

Notable alumni
 Megan Bozek - 2014 USA women's Olympic hockey player.
 Kyle Brandt - actor and media personality.
 Jalen Brunson - NBA basketball player, member of 2016 and 2018 NCAA champion Villanova Wildcats.
 Tamika Catchings - former professional basketball player, WNBA champion and 2011 MVP.
 Brad Cieslak - former NFL tight end for the Buffalo Bills and Cleveland Browns.
 Ed Edmunds - founder and president of Distortions Unlimited, a Halloween prop making company. Cast member of the Making Monsters TV series.
 Kevin Frederick - former Major League Baseball pitcher for the Toronto Blue Jays.
 Dylan Geick - wrestler, writer, and social media personality
 Ronald Goldman - friend of Nicole Brown Simpson and one of the murder victims from the trial of O.J. Simpson. Simpson was acquitted of his murder in 1995, but found liable for his death in a 1997 civil lawsuit.
 Hal Gordon (hot dog vendor) - unofficial mascot for the Oakland Athletics, hotdog vendor, and economist.
 Andrea Jaeger - professional tennis player, Wimbledon and French Open finalist, who became a nun.
 Holden Karnofsky - the chief executive officer of the Open Philanthropy Project and a co-founder and board member of GiveWell.
 Joe Lando - actor, known for Dr. Quinn, Medicine Woman.
 Alison LaPlaca - actress, known for sitcoms Duet and The John Larroquette Show.
 Drew Mormino - NFL football player for the Miami Dolphins.
 Ted Musgrave - professional race car driver.
 Matt O'Dwyer - former NFL offensive guard for the New York Jets and Cincinnati Bengals.
 Mosheh Oinounou (born 1982), former executive producer of CBS Evening News
 Danny Richmond - former professional ice hockey defenseman.
 Rex Ryan - analyst at ESPN, former NFL head coach.
 Rob Ryan - NFL assistant coach.
 Gene Stupnitsky - head writer and executive producer of The Office. Television and film writer, director, and producer.
 Lisa Wang - rhythmic gymnast, winner of the 2007 Pan Am Games.
 Andy Wozniewski - former professional hockey player.

References

External links

Official Website

1965 establishments in Illinois
Educational institutions established in 1965
Public high schools in Illinois
Lincolnshire, Illinois
Schools in Lake County, Illinois